Andrew James Secombe (born 26 April 1953), is a Welsh actor and author.

Early life, family and education
Born in Mumbles, in south Wales, Secombe is son of comedian/singer Harry Secombe (whom he later impersonated in a Goon Show special).
He attended the City of London Freemen's School in Ashtead, Surrey.

Career

Acting
Andy Secombe is an award-nominated stage, screen and radio actor. He trained at the Central School of Speech and Drama after which he spent several years criss-crossing the country both touring and in rep. His early career included seasons at both the Old Vic (King Lear, The Rivals) and the Young Vic (Hamlet, Stags and Hens, Coriolanus and What a Way to Run a Revolution). Other theatrical performances includes Godspell, Guys and Dolls, Around the World in Eighty Days, Long Days' Journey into Night, Benjamin Britten's A Midsummer Night's Dream, The Hitchhiker's Guide to the Galaxy Live! tour and The Invisible Man in the West End. He was recently Offie-nominated for playing Mr Gillie in the play of the same name at the Finborough Theatre.

On television he was a regular on both Playschool and Playaway and also appeared in the BBC TV children's sketch show Fast Forward and played Rover the Dog in Chips' Comic. He was one of the five in Five Alive and a regular on The Brian Conley Show. Other television appearances include Star Cops, Amnesty Beausire, Executive Stress, The Legend of Robin Hood, The Bill, Casualty, The Detectives, Unreported Incident, Britannia and Killing Eve.

In film, he is best known for providing the voice of Watto in the Star Wars prequels and in tie-in media relating to the Star Wars franchise. He also voiced Quello, another Toydarian, in Star Wars: Knights of the Old Republic II: The Sith Lords.

He has contributed vocals to a number of video games, including Nelly Cootalot: The Fowl Fleet and two entries in the Broken Sword series of games. For Penguin Audiobooks, he has recorded four novels by Mexican author Oscar de Muriel: The Strings of Murder, A Fever of the Blood, A Mask of Shadows and Loch of the Dead. He also regularly reads books for the Royal National Institute of Blind People (RNIB) and has also performed in radio productions, recently playing Reverend Wavering in the internet radio series Wooden Overcoats.

In March 2017, he starred in four episodes of the third series of The Missing Hancocks for BBC Radio 4; episodes that were originally aired in 1955 in the second series of Hancock's Half Hour starring his father Harry, after Tony Hancock had disappeared.

Writing
In the 2000s, Secombe focused on writing. He has penned five fantasy novels, including Limbo, Limbo Two: The Final Chapter and The Last House in the Galaxy. Looking for Mr Piggy-Wig (2008), about a post-nuclear Britain after the 'New Battle of Britain' is described by The Guardian as "best taken as a spoof on the genre". Endgame (2009) was criticised by Publishers Weekly for its "two-dimensional, clichéd characters and the tiresomely predictable story line".

In 2010 he published the book Growing Up with the Goons which is a memoir about growing up in the shadow of his father.

Filmography

Film

Television

Short films

Video games

Writing credits

References

External links

1953 births
The Goon Show
Living people
People from Swansea
Welsh male radio actors
Welsh male video game actors
Welsh male voice actors